Antoine Marie François Montalan (Lyon, 19 March 1767 — Paris, 22 March 1818) was a French Navy officer active during the French Revolutionary Wars and the Napoleonic wars.

Career

Early life 
Montalan was born to Marguerite Gastaldy and Jean-François Montalan, an industrialist of Lyon, on 19 March 1767. He started sailing in the French East India Company in 1787 as a volunteer. By 1792, Montalan has risen to the rank of Second Captain in the merchant navy.

French Revolutionary Wars 
On 12 February 1792, Montalan joined the Navy as an enseigne de vaisseau non entretenu (junior ensign), serving on the corvette Vanneau and later on the frigate Résolue.

In 1793, he was promoted to Lieutenant. He was appointed to Galathée from November 1793 to March 1794, and then on Sans Pareil.

On 19 March 1794, Montalan received his first command, the corvette Tourterelle. On 15 May 1795, Tourterelle met the British frigate Lively, and struck after a four-hour battle. Montalan subsequently underwent a court-martial or the loss of his ship, and was unanimously acquitted on 20 May 1796.

Promoted to Commander on 21 March 1796, Montalan was given command of Résolue, and took part in the Expédition d'Irlande as Nielly's flagship. In the night of 22 to 23 December, she accidentally collided with Redoutable, losing her of her bowsprit, foremast,  and mizzen; only her mainmast stayed upright. the 74-gun Pégase took Résolue in tow and returned with her to Brest, where they arrived on 30 December;

In 1797, Montalan took command of a frigate division comprising Sémillante, Fraternité and the corvette Berceau, with his flag on Sémillante, ferrying General Hédouville to Saint Domingue.

In 1799, he took command of another division, composed of Sémillante, Charente and two avisos to bring despatches to Admiral Bruix.

The engagement was indecisive, with the French ships escaping up the Loire. The British suffered three men killed and 35 wounded.

After the decommissioning of Sémillante on 19 July 1802, Montalan was appointed to captain Vertu in September. Commanding a frigate division, he was sent to Saint Domingue to repress slave rebelling at Gonaïves. He was promoted to Captain 2nd Class on 24 September 1803. After the Blockade of Saint-Domingue resulted in the capitulation of General Rochambeau in December 1803, Montalan was taken  to Jamaica as a prisoner of war, and eventually returned to France the next year.

Napoleonic Wars 
In 1808, Montalan was appointed to command Robuste. In April 1809, he transferred to Génois, which he captained until 1814.

Sources and references

References

Bibliography 
 Fonds Marine. Campagnes (opérations; divisions et stations navales; missions diverses). Inventaire de la sous-série Marine BB4. Tome premier : BB4 1 à 482 (1790-1826) 
 
  (1671-1870)
 

1767 births
1818 deaths
French Navy officers
French naval commanders of the Napoleonic Wars
Officiers of the Légion d'honneur